Hitkarini Sabha is a historic, educational, non-profit organization located in the city of Jabalpur, Madhya Pradesh, India.  It is runs some of the oldest academic institutions in the region. It was founded in 1868 by Raj Balwant Rao Kher, Diwan Biharilal Khajanchi and Shri Ambika Charan Banerjee.

Hitkarini Sabha was persuaded by Seth Govind Das to take a nationalist view. The students at Hitkarini Sabha institutions participated in the swaraj movement. Hitkarini Sabha has played a significant role in development of Hindi language. In a meeting in 1871, the Hitkarini Sabha met to discuss the question of court language. It was decided by an 8 to 2 margin that Hindi is more suitable than Urdu. It published a literary magazine for a while and organized meetings of leading Hindi authors. Seth Govind Das was associated with Hitkarini Sabha as a trustee and members of his family continue to serve the organization. 

Many distinguished scholars, authors and politicians, such as Ravishankar Shukla, Captain B P Tiwari, Kunji Lal Dubey, Osho Rajnish, Maharshi Mahesh Yogi, Gajanan Madhav Muktibodh have emerged from institutions run by the Hitkarini Sabha or have been closely associated with Hitkarini Sabha as visiting lecturers sharing their knowledge and wisdom. It used to be involved in literary activities also. A function in the honor of Nirala was organized by Subhadra Kumari Chauhan in 1943-44.

Its earliest institutions were started in buildings donated by Bholanath Singhai in the memory of his son Kasturchand, who also helped build the Hanumantal Bada Jain Mandir:

 Kasturchand Hitkarini Sanskrit Pathshala, Jabalpur 1870
 Kasturchand Hitkarini Higher Secondary School, Jonesganj, Jabalpur 1871

In the 1930s and 70s it added:

 Hitkarini City College (now Hitkarini Mahila Mahavidyalaya) 1933 
 Hitkarini Law College 1934. It is the oldest Law College of Madhya Pradesh.
 Babu Manmohandas Hitkarini Girls Higher Secondary School, Dixitpura, Jabalpur 1934
 Hitkarini Higher Secondary School, Devtal Garha, Jabalpur 1944
 Hitkarini Higher Secondary School, Govind Ganj, Jabalpur 1948
 Hitkarini Higher Secondary School, Gorakhpur, Jabalpur 1958
 Hitkarini Chaatravas (Hostel), Jabalpur 1958
 Hitkarini Prashikshan (B.Ed.) Mahila Mahavidyalaya, Jabalpur 1969
 Hitkarini Girls Higher Secondary School, BT Bangla, Garha, Jabalpur 1977

It has expanded significantly with a number of institutions added since the 1980s. In the recent decades it has focused on professional institutions.
 Hitkarini Higher Secondary School, Sahajpur, Jabalpur 1981
 Hitkarini Computer Center, Jabalpur 1984
 Hitkarini Girls Primary School, Garha, Jabalpur 1987
 Hitkarini Primary School, Garha, Jabalpur 1988
 Hitkarini Primary School, Gorakhpur, Jabalpur 1988
 Hitkarini Science Commerce & Arts College, Jabalpur 1993
 Hitkarini College of Engineering & Technology, Jabalpur 1997
 Hitkarini College of Computer Applications, Jabalpur 2000
 Hitkarini Institute of Nursing Science & Research, 2000 
 Babu Manmohandas Hitkarini Girls Primary School, Dixitpura, Jabalpur 2002
 Hitkarini Dental College & Hospital, Jabalpur 2004
 Hitkarini Children's Academy, Govind Ganj, Jabalpur 2008
 Hitkarini College of Architecture & Town Planning, Jabalpur 2009
 Babu Manmohandas Children's Academy, Dixitpura, Jabalpur 2010

Hitkarini Sabha is now runs 8 colleges, 18 schools, and a computer center, with more than 13,000 students, employing more than 1000 teachers and staff. It owns several properties in Jabalpur.

It celebrated its 150th anniversary in 2017.

See also
 Hitkarini College of Engineering & Technology
 Hanumantal Bada Jain Mandir

External links

References 

Educational organisations based in India
Education in Jabalpur
Founders of Indian schools and colleges
1868 establishments in India
Non-profit organisations based in India